"" ("Our Language") is the national anthem of Moldova. It has been used since 1994 and was officially adopted on 22 July 1995.

For a short period of time in the early 1990s, the national anthem of Moldova was "Deșteaptă-te, române!", which was and remains the national anthem of Romania. The lyrics were written by Alexei Mateevici (1888–1917) a month before his death. Mateevici contributed significantly to the national emancipation of Bessarabia. The music was composed by Alexandru Cristea.

Lyrics
The focus of "Limba noastră" is language; in this case, the national language of Moldova, which is referred to as either Romanian or Moldovan. It calls for the people to revive the usage of their native language. The poem does not refer to the language by name; it is poetically called "our language".

"Limba noastră" is based on a twelve-verse poem. For the officially-defined national anthem used today, the verses were selected and reorganised into five verses of four lines each; namely, the first, second, fifth, ninth and twelfth verses, respectively, which are highlighted in bold.

Images

See also

"Deșteaptă-te, române!", national anthem of Romania
"Dimãndarea pãrinteascã", ethnic anthem of the Aromanians
Moldovenism

Notes

References

External links

 Wikisource, "Limba noastră", full text of Mateevici's poem 
 State Symbols of the Republic of Moldova – The official page of the Republic of Moldova features a page about the flag and anthem, which include vocal and instrumental versions
 President's House – The official website of the President of Moldova has a page with information about the anthem. The Romanian version of the page also contains the music score of the anthem.
 Moldova: Limba noastră – Audio of the national anthem of Moldova, with information and lyrics (archive link)
 "Romanian Nationalism in the Republic of Moldova" by Andrei Panici, American University in Bulgaria, 2002

Moldovan songs
National symbols of Moldova
European anthems
National anthems
Songs about language
National anthem compositions in F major